Armond G. Hill (born March 31, 1953) is an American professional basketball coach and former player who is Director of Basketball Administration for Indiana University men's basketball.

He spent eight seasons in the NBA between 1976 and 1984, playing for the Atlanta Hawks, Seattle SuperSonics, San Diego Clippers and Milwaukee Bucks. After ending his playing career in 1984, he started a coaching career, and eventually became head coach at Columbia University in 1995.

After graduating from Bishop Ford Central Catholic High School in Brooklyn, Hill attended The Lawrenceville School for a postgraduate year before attending Princeton, where he played under Hall of Fame coach Pete Carril. He was named Ivy League Men's Basketball Player of the Year as a senior in 1976 and entered the NBA draft. Drafted by the Atlanta Hawks, Hill had a solid career as a role player in the NBA, compiling 6.9 points and 4.3 assists per game over eight seasons.

After his playing career Hill returned to Princeton to complete his baccalaureate degree, earning a B.A. in psychology in 1985. He then became an assistant coach at Lawrenceville School in Lawrenceville, New Jersey. Three years later he was promoted as head coach. Hill won two Coach of the Year Awards and in 1990, led Lawrenceville to the New Jersey State Prep School Championship.

In 1991, Hill entered the collegiate level by returning to his alma mater Princeton as an assistant coach under Pete Carril. In 1995, he succeeded Jack Rohan as head coach at Columbia University. In eight seasons as head coach of the Lions, Hill was unable to lead the team to a winning campaign and compiled a 72–141 record. On March 10, 2003, two days after Columbia finished with a 2–25 record (0–14 in Ivy League play), the worst season in the school's 103-year basketball history, Hill was fired.

During the 2003–04 NBA season, Hill became an assistant coach to Terry Stotts in Atlanta. After one season, he was hired by the Boston Celtics to aid Doc Rivers as assistant coach. When Rivers became the head coach of the Los Angeles Clippers, he retained Hill as an assistant. On November 16, 2020, the Clippers announced that Hill would not be retained as assistant coach.

On June 9, 2021 Hill was named Director of Basketball Administration for men's basketball at Indiana University.  He and Indiana head coach Mike Woodson coached together with the Clippers from 2014 to 2018.

References

External links

1953 births
Living people
American men's basketball players
Atlanta Hawks draft picks
Atlanta Hawks assistant coaches
Atlanta Hawks players
Basketball coaches from New York (state)
Basketball players from New York City
Boston Celtics assistant coaches
Columbia Lions men's basketball coaches
High school basketball coaches in the United States
Los Angeles Clippers assistant coaches
Milwaukee Bucks players
Point guards
Princeton Tigers men's basketball players
San Diego Clippers players
Seattle SuperSonics players
Sportspeople from Brooklyn